Watch What Happens Live! with Andy Cohen (abbreviated WWHL, previously named Watch What Happens Live!) is an American pop culture-based late-night talk show hosted by Andy Cohen, that premiered on Bravo on July 16, 2009.

The show features Bravo's own reality programming in the manner of an aftershow and popular culture news. The show's title was inspired by the network's then-slogan, "Watch what happens."

The show is produced live from New York City, allowing interaction with viewers by phone and social media.

In November 2013, Bravo renewed the show for two additional seasons.

On March 2, 2016, the show aired its 1,000th episode.

The show celebrated its ten-year milestone in June 2019 with Luann de Lesseps, John Mayer and Chrissy Teigen making appearances.

On March 13, 2020, the show suspended production due to the COVID-19 pandemic, during which Andy Cohen himself tested positive for the virus. The show had been produced from Cohen's apartment starting in March. The show returned to its Manhattan studio on October 11, 2020.

On January 19, 2022, Bravo renewed the show through 2023, which will mark the show’s 15th year on air.

See also
List of programs broadcast by Bravo
List of late-night American network TV programs
List of television shows filmed in New York City

References

External links

2000s American late-night television series
2000s American television talk shows
2009 American television series debuts
2010s American late-night television series
2010s American television talk shows
2020s American late-night television series
2020s American television talk shows
Aftershows
Bravo (American TV network) original programming
English-language television shows
Television series by Embassy Row (production company)
Television series by Sony Pictures Television
Television shows filmed in New York City